The 2013 Northeast Conference men's soccer season was the 33rd season of men's varsity soccer in the conference.

The Quinnipiac Bobcats are the defending regular season champions, while the Fairleigh Dickinson Knights are the defending tournament champions. Quinnipiac will be unable to defend their NEC regular season title, since they are moving to the Metro Atlantic Athletic Conference for 2013.

Central Connecticut won the Regular Season Championship by going 6-1-0 in conference play and will host the NEC tournament in New Britain, Connecticut. St. Francis Brooklyn won the 2013 NEC tournament Championship with the 4th seed by beating Central Connecticut (2-0) then Bryant (3-2).

Changes from 2012 

 Qunnipiac and Monmouth are leaving the conference and joining the MAAC.
 Mount St. Mary's is dropping its men's soccer program.

Teams

Stadia and locations

Standings

Results

Honors 

Player of the Year: Neco Brett (Robert Morris)
Defensive Player of the Year: Nicholas Walker (Fairleigh Dickinson)
Rookie of the Year: Conor Qualter (Central Connecticut)
Coach of the Year: Shaun Green (Central Connecticut)

2013 NEC First Team All-Conference

Postseason

NEC tournament

Note-Bryant advanced to the Championship Game via Penalty Kicks (3-0)

NCAA tournament

References 

 
2013 NCAA Division I men's soccer season